Hagen (Han) is a railway station located in Hagen, part of Neustadt am Rübenberge, Germany. The station is located on the Bremen–Hanover railway. The train services are operated by Deutsche Bahn as part of the Hanover S-Bahn. Hagen is served by the S2. It is in the Region zone of Hannover.

Train services
The following services currently call at Hagen (Han):

Railway stations in Lower Saxony
Hannover S-Bahn stations